The 2017 Buckinghamshire County Council election took place on 4 May 2017 as part of the 2017 local elections in the United Kingdom. All 49 councillors were elected from electoral divisions which returned one county councillor each by first-past-the-post voting for a four-year term of office, due to expire in 2021.

The Conservative Party retained an overall control on the council, winning 41 of the 49 seats on the council. Of the remaining 9 councillors, there were four Liberal Democrats, three Independents and one Labour. UKIP lost all six of their seats.

Due to the replacement of Buckinghamshire County Council by Buckinghamshire Council in 2020, the successor election to this election is the 2021 Buckinghamshire Council election.

Result

	
The overall turnout was 34.8% with a total of 135,665 valid votes cast.

Council Composition
Following the last election in 2013 the composition of the council was:

After the election, the composition of the council was:

Lib Dems - Liberal Democrats 
L - Labour Party
I - Independent
EWI - East Wycombe Independents

Ward results
Asterisks denote incumbent Councillors seeking re-election. Councillors seeking re-election were elected in 2013, and results are compared to that year's polls on that basis. All results are listed below:

Abbey

Amersham & Chesham Bois

Aston Clinton & Bierton

Aylesbury East

Aylesbury North

Aylesbury North West

Aylesbury South East

Aylesbury South West

Aylesbury West

Beaconsfield

Bernwood

Booker, Cressex & Castlefield

Buckingham East

Buckingham West

Chalfont St Giles

Chalfont St Peter

Chesham

Chess Valley

Chiltern Ridges

Chiltern Villages

Cliveden

Denham

Downley

Farnham Common & Burnham Beeches

Flackwell Heath, Little Marlow & Marlow South East

Gerrards Cross

Great Brickhill

Great Missenden

Grendon Underwood

Hazlemere

Iver

Ivinghoe

Little Chalfont & Amersham Common

Marlow

Penn Wood & Old Amersham

Ridgeway East

Ridgeway West

Ryemead & Micklefield

Julie Wassell was previously elected as a Liberal Democrat councillor for this ward at the last election.

Stoke Poges & Wexham

Stone and Waddesdon

Terriers & Amersham Hill

The Risboroughs

The Wooburns, Bourne End & Hedsor

Totteridge & Bowerdean

Tylers Green & Loudwater

Wendover, Halton & Stoke Mandeville

West Wycombe

Wing

Winslow

References

2017
2017 English local elections
2010s in Buckinghamshire